ALA-LC (American Library AssociationLibrary of Congress) is a set of standards for romanization, the representation of text in other writing systems using the Latin script.

Applications
The system is used to represent bibliographic information by North American libraries and the British Library (for acquisitions since 1975)
and in publications throughout the English-speaking world.

The Anglo-American Cataloguing Rules require catalogers to romanize access points from their non-Roman originals.  However, as the MARC standards have been expanded to allow records containing Unicode characters,
many cataloguers now include bibliographic data in both Roman and original scripts. The emerging Resource Description and Access continues many of AACR's recommendations but refers to the process as "transliteration" rather than "Romanization."

Scripts
The ALA-LC Romanization includes over 70 romanization tables.  Here are some examples of tables:
 A Cherokee Romanization table was created by the LC and ALA in 2012 and subsequently approved by the Cherokee Tri-Council meeting in Cherokee, North Carolina. It was the first ALA-LC Romanization table for a Native American syllabary.
 The Chinese Romanization table used the Wade–Giles transliteration system until 1997, when the Library of Congress (LC) announced a decision to switch to the Pinyin system.

See also

 ALA-LC romanization for Russian
 Devanagari transliteration
 Romanization of Arabic
 Romanization of Armenian
 Romanization of Belarusian
 Romanization of Bulgarian
 Romanization of Khmer 
 Romanization of Georgian
 Romanization of Persian
 Romanization of Ukrainian
 Romanization of Urdu

References

External links 
 ALA-LC Romanization Tables

 
Library cataloging and classification